Jeremy Chan Ming Yuew (born 17 July 1981) is a Singaporean actor and host. He was awarded best comedy performance in AACA.

Early life
Chan was educated in Zhangde Primary School and Saint Thomas Secondary School. He graduated from ITE College West (Dover Campus). At the age of 25, before participating in the second season of Project SuperStar, he was a bartender. He was known through his versatile singing in the show. Though he was eliminated in the revival round, he remained employed in the entertainment industry.

Career
Chan was talent-spotted from Project SuperStar. In 2006, Chan made his hosting debut in On the Beat, a MediaCorp Channel U variety show. He was then subsequently the host for On the Beat II, III, IV, V. In 2009, Chan made his acting debut in Table of Glory, a MediaCorp Channel 8 drama. In 2010, Chan made his film debut in Being Human, a Jteam Productions movie.

Personal life
Chan married Jesseca Liu on 16 July 2017.

Filmography

Film

TV series

Variety series

Discography
《乱掉》:OST of "Crouching Tiger Hidden Ghost"
 MediaCorp Music Lunar New Year Album 22'' 新传媒群星旺虎泰哥迎春乐

Awards and nominations

References

1981 births
Living people
Singaporean television presenters
Singaporean male television actors
Singaporean people of Chinese descent